Panaquire is a town in the state of Miranda, Venezuela. This town has 5110 inhabitants. It was founded in 1733 by Isleños, but is now largely inhabited by Afro-Venezuelans. Its main industry is cacao cultivation.

Populated places in Miranda (state)